Kolovrat is a Russian Rock Against Communism (RAC)/thrash metal band. This is a cult band among the Russian nationalists and has been described as "famous" in the RAC scene and "best known" of the Russian white power bands. It has been described as a neo-Nazi group.

History
The band was founded in 1994, in Moscow by Fedor Volkov and his friends. Denis Gerasimov is a frontman of the group from 2000 year. Originally called Russkoe Getto (Russian Ghetto), they changed their name to Kolovrat in the autumn of 1997. The band's songs cover a wide variety of styles including rock, metal, Oi!, NSBM and ballads.

On November 4, 2009, the band played openly for the first time in the center of Moscow, at the Bolotnaya Square as part of the yearly "Russian March".

The band was still around as of the mid-2010s.

References

Musical groups from Moscow
Russian rock music groups
Neo-Nazi musical groups
Neo-Nazism in Russia
Musical groups established in 1994
1994 establishments in Russia